Irrawaddy may refer to:

Irrawaddy River, the main river of Burma
Irrawaddy Delta, a rice growing region of the country
Ayeyarwady Region, an administrative division of Burma
The Irrawaddy, a Burmese news publication based in Chiang Mai, Thailand
Irrawaddy dolphin, a dolphin which is found in the Irrawaddy River
"Waters of Irrawaddy", the first song in Beyond Rangoon (soundtrack), composed by Hans Zimmer
Irrawaddy Green Towers, a mobile phone tower company which works for the military joint venture Mytel.